Mustang Peak is a summit in the Diablo Range on the northwest - southeast trending range of mountains marking the boundary of Monterey County and Fresno County, California. It overlooks the Kreyenhagen Hills and Kettleman Plain beyond it to the east, and the Jacalitos Hills and Pleasant Valley beyond it to the north. To the south is Joaquin Canyon, tributary to Cholame Creek and to the west is Mine Mountain and Cholame Creek beyond it, below its summit.

References 

Diablo Range
Mountains of Northern California
Mountains of Fresno County, California
Mountains of Monterey County, California